Joy Vazhayil, known as VP Joy, is an Indian poet, writer, researcher, and administrator. He is also known for books and research papers on the energy policy and also on philosophy of education, mind and metaphysics. He has published several literary works in Malayalam language, mainly poetic compositions.

During his official career spanning more than three and a half decades, he has held important assignments in the Government of India as well as in the State Government of Kerala, India known by his official name V. P. Joy.

Joy took charge as the Chief Secretary of State of Kerala, India on 28 February 2021. He is from the batch of 1987 of Indian Administrative Service

Life

Academic profile 
He was born in Ernakulam district, Kerala (Parents: V. V. Pathrose and Aleyamma). After his early education, he graduated in Electronics & Communication Engineering from the College of Engineering, Thiruvananthapuram. Later he did M.B.A. from the University of Birmingham, UK and subsequently completed his M.Phil. from the University Panjab, Chandigarh.

He was awarded doctoral degree from the Indian Institute of Technology, Delhi on Optimization of India's Energy Strategies for Climate Change Mitigation. He was selected as a Giorgio Ruffolo Post-doctoral Research Fellow in the Sustainability Science Program of Harvard University in 2014.

Career 
Joy Vazhayil joined the Vikram Sarabhai Space Center as Scientist/Engineer in 1985 and worked on the control and guidance of launch vehicles.

Later he joined the Indian Administrative Service in 1987 and held various positions in the Government of Kerala and the Government of India.

Literary Contributions 
Joy Vazhayil has published twelve poetic works and two novels in Malayalam. His book ‘Raamanuthapam’ has been translated to Hindi by Dr. H. Balasubramanian which has won the translation award of Ministry of Culture, Government of India.

Awards and honors 

 S. K. Pottekkatt Award for the Poetry collection ‘Nimishajalakam’
 Akshaya Literary Award
 Pazhassi Raja Sahityapratibha Puraskaram, 2019
 The research paper, "A framework for equitable apportionment of emission reduction commitments to mitigate global warming" published in the International Journal of Energy Sector Management was the Highly Commended Award Winner of the Literati Network Awards for Excellence 2012.
 Appreciation award for Anti-tobacco activities in Kerala State by the Regional Cancer Association, 2001.

Research Papers  

 Vazhayil, J.P., Balasubramanian., R, 2010. Copenhagen commitments and implications: A comparative analysis of India and China. Energy Policy 38, 7442-7450
 Vazhayil, J.P., Balasubramanian, R., 2013. A Log frame Analysis of India's Climate Change Mitigation Policies and Technology Implications. In Sundaresan, J. ; Sreckesh, S., ; Ramanathan, A.L. ; Sonnenschen, Lenand ; Boojh, Ram, Climate Change and Environment, Scientific Publishers, Jodhpur, India.
 Vazhayil, J.P., Sharma, V.K., Balasubramanian, R., 2011. A framework for equitable apportionment of emission reduction commitments to mitigate global warming. International Journal of Energy Sector Management 5, 381-406
 Vazhayil, J.P. Balasubramanian, R. 2012. Hierarchical Multi-Objective Optimization of India's Energy Strategy Portfolio for Sustainable Development, International Journal of Energy Sector Management, Vol. 6 Iss: 3,  pp.301-20
 Vazhayil, J.P., Balasubramanian, R., 2013. Optimization of India's Power Sector Strategies Using Weight Restricted Stochastic Data Envelopment Analysis, Energy Policy, Vol 56, pp. 456–465.
 Vazhayil, J.P., Balasubramanian, R., February 2014. Optimization of India's Electricity Generation Portfolio Using Intelligent Pareto-Search Genetic Algorithm, International Journal of Electrical Power & Energy Systems 55, 13–20.
 Narasimhan, Ravichandran, Vazhayil, J.P., Narayanaswami, Sundaravalli, 2018,.Employees' provident fund organization: Empowering members by digital transformation, DOI: 10.1002/pa.1844 Journal of Public Affairs.

References 

Malayalam-language writers
1963 births
Living people
21st-century Indian poets
People from Ernakulam district
Indian male poets
Indian male novelists
Poets from Kerala
Novelists from Kerala
Indian Administrative Service officers
Indian government officials
Indian Space Research Organisation people